Pensacola Pass, separating mainland Florida from Santa Rosa Island, is the mouth of Pensacola Bay.
Pensacola Pass forms a water passage that connects Pensacola Bay with the Gulf of Mexico to the south, in the U.S. state of Florida, east of the Alabama/Florida state line. The surrounding area is heavily developed, with high-rise condominiums. However, there are nearby beach-front parks, with Fort Pickens on the eastern side of Pensacola Pass.

Description
Pensacola Pass is the name of the waterway connecting the Gulf to Pensacola Bay. Ships and boats use this passage to travel between the two. During the daily flood tide, fresh saltwater enters Pensacola Pass from the Gulf of Mexico; waters are pulled out on the ebb tide, flushing the bay. The pass is located in the Floridian counties of Escambia and Santa Rosa. It is protected from devastating ocean waves by the Fairpoint peninsula as well as a barrier island, Santa Rosa, from which the county gets its name. The pass itself is about 21 kilometers long and 4 kilometers wide.

History 
Northwest Florida has been home to many different Native tribes. The Pensacola area was controlled by the Creek, who controlled much of the southern United States, and spoke in a Muskogee dialect. Although members of the Creek tribe, they were called the “Pensacola People,” which is where the area got its name. Today, the Santa Rosa County Creek Indian Tribe is still located between Pensacola and Milton, and their main goal is to raise community awareness of the cultures and traditions of Native Americans.

The Pensacola area was first explored by Europeans in the 16th century. Diego Miruelo was the first explorer to sail in the bay of Pensacola, sailing for Spain. Two others, Panfilo de Narvaez and Hernando de Soto also explored the bay area which they called the “Bay of Ochuse,” because of the Ochuse natives that lived there.

The first Spanish settlement in Pensacola was founded in 1559 by the explorer Tristan de Luna y Arenallo. He named it the “Bahia Santa Maria de Filipina.” With 1400 people arriving in 11 ships from Mexico, this was the first European settlement in what is now the United States. The colony was later nearly obliterated by a hurricane and the survivors abandoned it in 1561. It was concluded that Florida might be too dangerous to colonize. It was left alone for 135 years.

In 1693, Mexican Viceroy Gaspar de Sandoval Silva, Count of Galve, sent a small crew to inspect the gulf coast from north of the Pensacola bay to the mouth of the Mississippi (the Pensacola Pass). In order to see if the land was adequate for a settlement, they brought the renowned scientist and historian Carlos de Singuenza who renamed the bay “Santa Maria de Galve.” He authored a report that claimed the land was more than hospitable, it was a paradise. In 1698, a settlement was created by the Pensacola Pass that was used as a buffer against the French-owned Louisiana. Andres de Arriola was governor and found the conditions in Florida to be much more harsh than Siguenza had described.

The Spanish had become allies against the English in an attempt to try to prevent them from taking over the Southeast. However, in 1719, it was the French who took Pensacola with a fleet of ships and allied native warriors. The Spanish garrison commander wasn't even aware that a war had begun, so he had no choice but to surrender the fort with the conditions that the Spanish could continue living in the city, and the military men could return to a different fort. Another hurricane hit in 1722, so the French left the city, burning it, so it could not be taken back by the Spanish. The local Spanish created a new city, this time on the mainland instead of the barrier island (Santa Rosa) so it could be protected from large waves and severe weather.

-                 The Spanish (1722-1763)

-                 British West Florida (1763-1781)

-                 The Spanish (1781-1819)

The War of 1812 caused a power shift near the Pensacola Pass. The Spanish holdings in America were weakened, so the United States ended up taking over the area and created a navy yard and 3 forts around Pensacola.

2010 Gulf oil spill
Following the Deepwater Horizon oil spill (called the "Gulf oil spill"), the entrance to Pensacola Pass was closed,
with a floating barrier system in June 2010, to control tidal flow of oil entering from the Gulf of Mexico. The daily high tide was causing oil-contaminated water to enter Pensacola Bay. The barrier system was to be  designed to allow boats to travel through Pensacola Pass during the ebb tide, but to close during the rising tide.

Although this was the initial plan, the booming plan was never fully implemented. Due to strong currents in the Pass, the boom broke. There was no alternative system in place in areas of less current, nor was there a plan to trap incoming oil, therefore oil product freely entered the Pass.

Post-Oil Spill 
The beaches in Pensacola were Ground Zero for the oil spill. Within two weeks of making landfall, the spill had taken over the Pensacola Pass. The Gulf Oil Spill killed local wildlife and devastated the ecosystem. Fish that didn't die were still inedible, so seafood restaurants suffered. The beaches were blackened, and tourism was devastated. Tourism was the main source of income for the area, so the economy was crippled in what many called a “lost summer.”

Research shows that the major metropolitan areas between Pensacola and Panama City lost around $150 million combined per month in the months of June, July, August and September 2010. Bear in mind that 2010 was the tail end of the recession, so unemployment was already up to 10%. That summer, businesses reported 50%-80% drops in revenue.

BP Oil agreed to pay millions in settlements to local environmental efforts and economic development. This helped rejuvenate the tourist industry which skyrocketed, going from $5.4 million in 2010 to $12.3 million in 2019.

Aftermath 
Recent research shows that beaches affected by the spill may take over 30 years to biodegrade. However, local governments are working with volunteers to clean up the Pensacola beaches. In 2019, there were 447 petroleum cleanup sites managed with 28 sites being successfully cleaned up and closed. Major protests continue for the burning of fossil fuels, such as oil, and spreading awareness of Climate Change. Days after the oil hit shore, President Obama visited the Panama beaches and claimed that there would be “unprecedented federal response” to the historic environmental disaster.

In response to the Deepwater Horizon incident, Escambia county, which received 97% of the oil in Florida and 52 miles of the shore oiled, passed the RESTORE Act (Resources and Ecosystems Sustainability, Tourist Opportunities and Revived Economies Act). The Act states that penalty money received from the parties responsible for the oil spill will be used to protect the environment and economy of the Gulf Coast region. Other programs not under the RESTORE Act, such as the Natural Resources Damage Assessment or the National Fish and Wildlife Foundation were still funded separately through the oil spill fines.

Other Environmental Hazards in Pensacola 
Pensacola recently ranked No. 12 in the United States for toxic releases per square mile. With pollution from industrial plants, landfills, septic tanks and more, the Pensacola area and Escambia county are in harsh conditions.

Pollution got so bad, in fact, that in 1999 there was a special grand jury assembled to assess local air and water quality. This jury found that local regulators had been failing their task of diminishing pollution. Major corporate industries were finding loopholes in regulations or managed to convince local governments to relax them. The grand jury ultimately issued 27 specific recommendations on how the county can protect its natural resources, but many believe that these suggestions are still being ignored.

Pensacola has had multiple other major environmental disasters as well. There was the Saufley Field Landfill fire, where waste with certain toxicity levels was burnt. The fire produced hazardous gasses and particulate matter.[ This fire burnt for 4 months in 2005 and 2006. In 2017, there was the International Paper spill explosion that launched sticky black debris all over neighborhoods.

References

Landforms of Escambia County, Florida
Intracoastal Waterway
Deepwater Horizon oil spill
Inlets of Florida